Scolecenchelys is a genus of eels in the snake eel family Ophichthidae.

Species
There are currently 21 recognized species in this genus:
 Scolecenchelys acutirostris (M. C. W. Weber & de Beaufort, 1916) (Sharp-nose worm eel) 
 Scolecenchelys aoki (D. S. Jordan & Snyder, 1901) (Misaki worm eel)
 Scolecenchelys australis (W. J. Macleay, 1881) (Short-fin worm eel)
 Scolecenchelys brevicaudata Hibino & Kimura, 2015 (Short-tail worm eel) 
 Scolecenchelys breviceps (Günther, 1876) (Short-headed worm eel)
 Scolecenchelys castlei J. E. McCosker, 2006 (Deep-water bigeyed worm eel)
 Scolecenchelys chilensis (J. E. McCosker, 1970) (Chilean worm eel)
 Scolecenchelys cookei (Fowler, 1928)
 Scolecenchelys fuscapenis J. E. McCosker, S. Ide & Endo, 2012 (Black-tailed worm eel) 
 Scolecenchelys fuscogularis Hibino, Y. Kai & Kimura, 2013 (Dark-throat worm eel) 
 Scolecenchelys godeffroyi (Regan, 1909) (Godeffroy worm eel)
 Scolecenchelys gymnota (Bleeker, 1857) (Slender worm eel)
 Scolecenchelys iredalei (Whitley, 1927) (Coral worm eel) 
 Scolecenchelys laticaudata (J. D. Ogilby, 1897) (Red-fin worm eel)
 Scolecenchelys macroptera (Bleeker, 1857) (Narrow worm eel)
 Scolecenchelys nicholsae (Waite, 1904) (Nichols' worm eel)
 Scolecenchelys profundorum (J. E. McCosker & Parin, 1995) (Deep-water worm eel)
 Scolecenchelys puhioilo (J. E. McCosker, 1979)
 Scolecenchelys robusta Hibino & Kimura, 2015 (Robust worm eel) 
 Scolecenchelys vermiformis (W. K. H. Peters, 1866) 
 Scolecenchelys xorae (J. L. B. Smith, 1958) (Orange-head worm eel)

References

 

 
Ophichthidae